Yelena Svezhentseva (née Burgiman; born December 21, 1968) is a retired female javelin thrower from Uzbekistan. She represented the Unified Team at the 1992 Summer Olympics, finishing in ninth place in the final rankings. She set her personal best (61.76 metres) in 1992 with the old javelin type.

Achievements

References
  sports-reference

1968 births
Living people
Uzbekistani female javelin throwers
Soviet female javelin throwers
Russian female javelin throwers
Athletes (track and field) at the 1992 Summer Olympics
Olympic athletes of the Unified Team